The Texas A&M–Corpus Christi Islanders men's basketball statistical leaders are individual statistical leaders of the Texas A&M–Corpus Christi Islanders men's basketball program in various categories, including points, assists, blocks, rebounds, and steals. Within those areas, the lists identify single-game, single-season, and career leaders. The Islanders represent Texas A&M University–Corpus Christi in the NCAA's Southland Conference.

Texas A&M–Corpus Christi began competing in intercollegiate basketball in 1999. These lists are updated through the end of the 2020–21 season.

Scoring

Rebounds

Assists

Steals

Blocks

References

Lists of college basketball statistical leaders by team
Statistical